Rose of the Asphalt Streets is a 1922 German silent drama film directed by Richard Löwenbein and starring , Robert Leffler, and Olga Engl.

The film's sets were designed by the art director Siegfried Wroblewsky.

Cast

References

Bibliography

External links

1922 films
Films of the Weimar Republic
Films directed by Richard Löwenbein
German silent feature films
German black-and-white films
German drama films
1922 drama films
Silent drama films
1920s German films
1920s German-language films